By 2019, New York State Attorney General (AG) Letitia James had begun investigating the Trump Organization for potential financial fraud in a civil capacity. In 2022, James filed a lawsuit against the Trumps, which resulted in the imposition of an independent monitor to prevent future fraud.

In 2020, Eric Trump invoked his Fifth Amendment right against self-incrimination over 500 times in his testimony for the AG. In November 2021, The Washington Post reported that between 2011 and 2015 the organization presented several properties as being worth far more to potential lenders than to tax officials; in 2012, it cited the 40 Wall Street building as being worth over $500 million more to the former than to the latter. Lawyers for the Trumps unsuccessfully sought to have both the case and related subpoenas dismissed. Donald Trump reportedly pleaded the Fifth more than 400 times in his August 2022 deposition.

In September 2022, James filed a civil lawsuit against Trump, his three oldest children, and the organization for alleged fraud. Additionally, she referred the case to federal criminal prosecutors and the Internal Revenue Service. In November, the New York judge overseeing the lawsuit appointed retired judge Barbara S. Jones to monitor the organization. A trial is scheduled for October 2023.

Background

In a defamation case against TrumpNation author Timothy L. O'Brien, Donald Trump testified in 2007 that "I think everybody" exaggerates their property values and that he did not do so "beyond reason". He said he would give his opinion to Trump Organization chief financial officer (CFO) Allen Weisselberg, who "predominately" determined final values, which Trump called "conservative". Regarding one case in which a property increased from $80 million in 2005 to $150 million in 2006, Trump stated, "The property was valued very low, in my opinion, then and it became very—it just has gone up." He was unable to provide a reason for this other than his opinion. Between 2011 and 2015, the Trump Organization presented several properties as being worth millions of dollars—in one case over $500 million—more to potential lenders than to tax officials; this was reported by The Washington Post in November 2021.

In January 2017, ahead of Trump's inauguration as U.S. president, his attorney Sheri Dillon announced that the organization's businesses would be transferred to a trust controlled by Trump's sons Donald Jr. and Eric Trump, as well as Weisselberg.

In February 2019, prompted by U.S. House Representative Alexandria Ocasio-Cortez  asking whether Trump had ever presented inflated assets to an insurance company, former Trump personal attorney Michael Cohen testified to Congress that Trump "inflated [the organization's] total assets when it served his purposes, such as trying to be listed amongst the wealthiest people in Forbes, and deflated his assets to reduce his real estate taxes." Following Cohen's testimony, in March, the New York State Department of Financial Services issued a subpoena to Aon, the organization's longtime insurance broker. The same month, the office of New York Attorney General (AG) Letitia James began investigating the organization, having stated that she intended to do so during her 2018 campaign. By December, James's office had subpoenaed the organization for some records which it subsequently failed to provide for at least 21 months.

Overview 

In March 2019, the New York AG's office (OAG) began investigating the organization. In August 2020, James disclosed in a court filing that it was conducting a civil investigation of the organization for the asset inflation allegation (which could lead to a settlement or a lawsuit), asking a court to compel the organization to provide information it had been withholding, including testimony from Eric Trump. The filing noted that Eric Trump had resisted a subpoena and abruptly canceled an interview scheduled for the previous month. In September, New York judge Arthur Engoron ordered Eric Trump to sit for a deposition by October 7; he was deposed on October 5 and reportedly invoked his Fifth Amendment right against self-incrimination over 500 times.

On September 2, 2021, Judge Engoron ordered the organization to submit a report explaining what it was doing to comply with subpoenas from the OAG, one of which dated back to December 2019. If this request was not met by October 15, an electronic discovery firm was to be commissioned to review the company's records.
On December 1, James subpoenaed Trump in the civil case, with the intent of deposing him on January 7, 2022. Ivanka and Donald Trump Jr. were issued subpoenas in the matter on the same day.

On December 20, Trump's lawyer Alina Habba filed a lawsuit in federal court against James, alleging that her case against the former president was "guided solely by political animus and a desire to harass, intimidate, and retaliate against a private citizen who she views as a political opponent" and that his civil rights were being violated. The next month, James filed a motion requesting that Trump's suit be dismissed, arguing that he was only trying to block his deposition. On May 13, 2022, U.S. District Court judge Brenda K. Sannes held a hearing in the matter but issued no ruling; on May 27, she dismissed the lawsuit. On June 1, Trump filed a federal notice of appeal. On August 16, Habba requested that the U.S. Court of Appeals for the 2nd Circuit revive the lawsuit. On January 24, 2023, Trump's team withdrew the appeal, with Habba asserting that this was done "for strategic purposes".

On January 3, 2022, James and a lawyer for the organization filed a court document naming Ivanka and Donald Trump Jr. as respondents in the civil case. Additionally, the filing noted that the two Trumps and their father had moved to block their subpoenas on the premise that the AG was attempting to sidestep due process to gather evidence against them in the related criminal case. According to a legal expert cited by The New York Times, this is the responsibility of the defendants' lawyers to prove, but the Trumps could invoke their right against self-incrimination during their testimony, while refusal to testify could be cited in the civil case. James argued that the Trumps were using a continued pattern of "delay tactics" to keep her from interviewing them under oath. On January 10, Habba filed a motion seeking a stay of proceedings to allow an injunction against James on the same essential basis as Trump's lawsuit against the AG. At a political rally on January 15, Trump showed a video compilation of James referring to him as an "illegitimate president" and calling attention to his finances; this ended with the text "unhinged liberal" placed over James's face. At another rally two weeks later, Trump said of James and Fani Willis (both of whom are African Americans and were scrutinizing the legality of actions by Trump): "If these radical, vicious, racist prosecutors do anything wrong or illegal, I hope we are going to have in this country the biggest protest we have ever had." On January 31, James filed a motion arguing that her case "presents no emergency requiring the extraordinary relief of a preliminary injunction". She also clarified that her remarks against Trump had been made while campaigning in the 2018 New York AG election, stating, "I pursue cases based on evidence ... the politics stop at my door."

On January 18, James filed a motion to compel Trump and his two oldest children to appear in court and provide documents, stating that "Thus far in our investigation, we have uncovered significant evidence that suggests Donald J. Trump and the Trump Organization falsely and fraudulently valued multiple assets and misrepresented those values to financial institutions for economic benefit." Additionally, James accused Trump of making misstatements to the IRS. Investigators stated that the "focus of the subpoena, and the investigation, is Mr. Trump's statement of financial condition," alleging that Trump's financial statements were used to secure more than $300 million in loans, and that these "were generally inflated as part of a pattern to suggest that Mr. Trump's net worth was higher than it otherwise would have appeared". According to the AG's motion, over 930,000 documents had been provided by the organization in response to subpoenas and about a dozen employees and former employees had provided testimony. However, of over five million documents provided by the company overall, only three were provided by Trump himself; two of these were cited in the AG's motion, in addition to Trump's federal income tax information, which he approved the release of to the AG. Trump's handwriting and signature are present on some of the hard-copy documents.

The New York AG's filing cites financial inaccuracies including the organization's golf course near Aberdeen, Scotland, which the AG said was valued at $435.56 million by Trump in 2014, over twice its previous year estimate. This was apparently based on the potential building of 2,500 luxury homes, despite less than 1,500 of such units being approved by Scottish officials. Weisselberg had been unable to explain the discrepancy. Additionally, James cited Trump's own three-story apartment in Trump Tower, which he reported as being 30,000 square feet; according to the New York AG it is actually about 11,000 square feet. A 2017 Forbes article supports the smaller figure and estimates the apartment's value to be less than a third of Trump's valuation of over $200 million. According to a later court filing by the AG, Weisselberg "admitted that the apartment's value had been overstated by 'give or take' $200 million".

On February 1, lawyers for the Trumps filed a request for the subpoenas to be "quashed", again alleging James's "political animus" and that she had thereby violated the Equal Protection Clause of both the Constitution of the United States and New York as well as a state criminal procedural law, the latter two of which the filing states "created protections for subpoenaed witnesses that federal law does not provide". The filing cites the two state laws as dictating that "an agency conducting a criminal investigation through an active grand jury is required, if the witness is subpoenaed, to examine the subject or target of the investigation [in front of] the grand jury."

On February 9, Mazars informed the organization that it would no longer support the financial statements it had prepared for the organization from mid-2010 to mid-2020, owing to findings from the New York AG's January 18 filing and other sources. A Trump Organization spokesperson claimed that the development "effectively renders the investigations by the DA and AG moot". On February 14, separate court filings were made on behalf of the AG and Trump; James cited the Mazars correspondence in requesting that her subpoenas be upheld, and lawyers for Trump said he lacked knowledge of potentially misleading financial statements. In a five-page statement issued the next day, Trump claimed that Mazars had cut ties with him because of "vicious intimidation tactics" by investigators and that his brand value made up for any alleged financial discrepancies. James argued that this contradicted the defensive pleading from a day earlier.

On February 17, Judge Arthur Engoron ruled in favor of James's subpoenas. In response to Trump's lawyer Alina Habba's request for the civil investigation to be paused until the conclusion of the criminal inquiry, Engoron cited the fact that neither the AG nor DA had subpoenaed the Trumps to appear before a jury. However, the New York judge affirmed that refusals by the Trumps to answer potentially incriminating questions in the civil case should not be cited in the criminal matter. The lawyer for the two Trump children, Alan Futerfas, admitted that there was no evidence that the Trump children were targets of the criminal probe. Habba accused James of bias and "prosecutorial misconduct", to which Engoron maintained that "a prosecutor [disliking] someone does not prevent a prosecution," stating, "If Ms. James has a thing against [Trump], that's not ... unlawful discrimination. He's just a bad guy she should go after as the chief law enforcement officer of the state." Habba also claimed that Trump belongs to a protected class, which the judge pointed out is reserved for categorizations such as race, religion, and sex—not political persuasion. In his ruling, Engoron derided the organization's portrayal of the AG case as "moot" and set deadlines of 14 days for Donald Trump to produce requested documents and 21 days for depositions from all three Trumps. A notice of appeal was filed on February 28.
On March 3, Engoron approved an agreement between James and the Trumps: Donald Trump would provide requested documents by March 31, and the Trumps would not have to testify while the appeal was processed. On March 28, James moved to uphold that all three Trumps must testify, citing an example of a group of apartments being valued in financial statements at $49.6 million, over 66 times the outside evaluation of $750,000. A state appellate court heard arguments on May 11.
On May 26, the First Judicial Department of the Supreme Court of New York State upheld Engoron's February ruling that the Trumps must testify, stating, "The existence of a criminal investigation does not preclude civil discovery of related facts." Per an agreement made by the Trumps' lawyers in March, the defendants were to be deposed within two weeks, but this was postponed to July 15–22. On June 8, the three Trumps filed a notice of appeal to the New York Court of Appeals, the state's highest court. On June 14, that court dismissed the request (as well as a separate one to stay the subpoenas) on the basis that no "substantial constitutional question" had been raised requiring intervention.

On March 28, Engoron ordered a forensics company hired by the Trumps to provide its findings by April 22 and approved the organization's request to comply with a subpoena by April 29.
On April 8, James asked the court to compel real-estate firm Cushman & Wakefield, which conducted appraisals for several Trump Organization properties (before cutting ties by January 2021), to comply with a February 2022 subpoena as well as an earlier one that was partially fulfilled. A Cushman spokesperson stated that it was untrue that the firm had not responded to the subpoenas "in good faith". On April 25, Engoron allowed the OAG to name Cushman & Wakefield as a respondent in the civil inquiry and ordered the firm to provide subpoenaed documents. The subpoenas target five appraisers in particular who the AG alleges made misstatements on behalf of the organization. On May 11, the firm appealed the subpoenas on the basis that complying would compromise the privacy of clients unrelated to the inquiry, but stated that "we wish to continue working with the [AG]". On June 16, a state appeals court dismissed the appeals. Some 800,000 pages of documents were provided by a late June deadline, but those directly related to Trump or the organization remained outstanding. Two days after the deadline passed, the real-estate firm requested two more weeks to comply with the unsatisfied subpoena as an  firm searches through millions of Cushman employee emails to find relevant data. On July 1, the OAG asked Engoron to compel the firm to immediately turn over the subpoenaed documents, arguing that the firm knew the extent of the request by late April. On July 5, the judge ruled that the firm would be held in contempt, with a $10,000 daily fine starting on July 7. The firm said it would appeal the ruling. On August 5, the OAG disclosed that it had received over 35,000 documents from the firm and asked for the contempt order to be purged.

On April 7, James asked the court to hold Trump in civil contempt and impose a daily fine of $10,000 for "not [complying] at all" with the March 31 deadline for subpoenaed documents; his lawyers had instead raised new objections and argued that the documents could only be produced by the organization. On April 19, Trump again claimed in a court filing that he did not have the documents. On April 25, Engoron held Trump in civil contempt and approved a $10,000 daily fine. On April 29, Engoron rejected an affidavit from Trump denying that he had the requested documents and ordered him to file a new one answering "where he believes such files are currently located" to release him from contempt. On May 2, Habba requested that the Appellate Division of New York's First Judicial Department stay Engoron's contempt order, which the appeals judge rejected the next day, referring the matter to a full bench. On May 6, Trump's lawyers filed a 66-page document detailing the search for subpoenaed documents and an affidavit from Trump swearing that there were no relevant documents that had not yet been produced; he mentioned that four of his cell phones had gone missing, including one he received from the organization in 2015 and one which was "taken" from him while he was president. On May 11, Engoron agreed to purge Trump's contempt on the basis of certain conditions being met by May 20, including that Trump pay a retroactively reduced fine of $110,000, the completion of a third-party firm's search, and that further affidavits explain the organization's document-retention policies. The first two conditions were met on May 19. Late on May 20, several people involved in keeping Donald Trump's records, including his longtime executive assistant Rhona Graff, provided Trump's lawyers with affidavits as part of the effort to lift Trump's contempt status. Trump's counsel reported that they were unable to contact twelve of his other former executive assistants. On May 23, the OAG submitted a court filing opposed to clearing the contempt order until June 1 so an unlisted executive assistant could provide an affidavit and Graff could answer questions unsatisfied by hers. On May 31, Graff disclosed that the organization did not have a document-retention policy and she could not recall Trump keeping copies of documents. On June 1, the OAG and the defense counsel agreed that by June 3 the latter would provide a report of their effort to contact nonrespondent former executive assistants, as well as an affidavit from executive assistant Molly Michael, who is involved with the pro-Trump Save America political action committee (PAC) but not the organization. A June 3 court filing revealed that of a dozen former Trump executive assistants, a voicemail had been left for six, two claimed they would call back and four could not be contacted. Citing Graff's testimony as conflicting with Trump's claim in late April that it was his "customary practice to delegate document handling and retention responsibilities to ... executive assistants", the AG asked the judge to require the submission of additional evidence by June 13. On June 8, Engoron ruled that Trump would remain in contempt unless officials from the organization provide by June 17 sworn statements explaining what happened to Trump's handwritten instructions after they were delivered to the organization's golf, hotel, legal and marketing departments. On June 19, Business Insider cited a former organization employee who stated that there was no document-retention policy regarding Trump's written instructions and "In most cases you either threw it in the garbage or ... the shredder." (Trump testified for the E. Jean Carroll case that he and a longtime executive assistant "keep documents ... We keep everything.") The OAG had until June 20 to decide whether it was satisfied with the compliance of Trump's company regarding subpoenaed documents. On that date, the OAG agreed to the contempt order being lifted. On June 29, Engoron lifted the order but directed the $110,000 fine to be held in an escrow account during the continuing appeal effort. On January 25, 2023, a panel of judges began to weigh arguments about whether to void the fine. On February 14, a three-judge panel upheld the fine.

On April 25, 2022, the senior enforcement counsel for the OAG stated that "The process is near the end." A statute of limitations to file a lawsuit based on alleged misconduct, which was suspended by the organization to allow time to review documents, was set to expire on April 30.
On June 2, James stated that there was clear evidence of fraudulent valuation by Trump and suggested the dissolution of the organization as one action a lawsuit could call for. Anti-fraud laws which could be cited include New York's Martin Act and Executive Law § 63(12); both have previously been employed by the OAG, the latter against two Trump businesses.

In July, a Black former employee of Trump lawyer Alina Habba sued her on an accusation of racial discrimination after Habba allegedly shouted "I hate that Black bitch!" in response to losing a case against the AG. The filing also cites Habba's habit of rapping the word "nigger" with a colleague, of which audio recordings exist, as well as other slants against Blacks and Jews. According to the suit, Habba defended herself by saying "I am a fucking minority myself!" (citing her Arab descent) and arguing, "Everybody listens to Kanye West—and I'm not allowed to?"

After a delay imposed by the July 14 death of their mother, Ivana Trump, Donald Jr. and Ivanka were reportedly deposed on July 28 and August 3, respectively. Neither reportedly pleaded the Fifth Amendment, with Donald Jr. reportedly answering all questions. It was later revealed that Donald Jr. testified that his knowledge of accounting was minimal and that from 2010 onwards, he did not help prepare the company's financial statements and had at most influenced them via tangential input; he stated that he signed financial documents on the recommendation of accounting or legal staff. He further stated that he had done "all the leasing" of 40 Wall Street. Donald Sr. was deposed on August 10 and reportedly pleaded the Fifth over 400 times, with his only detailed comment reputedly being an attack on the AG and her inquiry. The Daily Beast later reported that Trump's lawyers had requested that the deposition be moved to Trump Tower, reputedly due to security concerns of the Secret Service. On September 13, the service denied having raised such concerns. Also in September, the OAG reportedly rejected a settlement offer from the organization.

Lawsuit

At a September 21 press conference, James announced a lawsuit against Trump, his three oldest children, and the organization for fraud and other forms of misrepresentation, citing over 200 alleged instances and asserting that Trump "wildly exaggerated his net worth by billions of dollars". James cited New York Executive Law § 63(12) as lending her "broad and special powers". The suit asserts that between 2011 and 2021 Trump and the organization made over 200 "false and misleading valuations of assets on his annual Statements of Financial Condition to defraud financial institutions" and, amongst other charges, that he used low valuations to avoid paying between $85 and $150 million in interest charges on loans from Deutsche Bank. The suit seeks about $250 million in damages, the instatement of a five-year ban on the company conducting real-estate transactions in the state and a permanent bar against Trump and his three oldest children from officiating or directing any business or corporation there. Additionally, James cited evidence of potential criminal insurance and bank fraud, for which she referred the case to federal criminal prosecutors in Manhattan and the IRS.

Besides the inflated values of Trump Tower—as well as its square footage—and 40 Wall Street, James's lawsuit alleges that in his financial statements, Trump inflated the value of Mar-a-Lago by perhaps ten times (with his value based on potentially developing the property for residential use, which is prevented by the deed). Trump also omitted restrictions regarding his 30% share in 1290 Avenue of the Americas (which probably prevent him from selling it for decades) and portrayed his interests as cash, while overstating the building's overall value by $1.5 billion. According to the suit, the organization valued Trump Park Avenue at $350 million, while a 2010 valuation found it to be worth $72.5 million. Twelve rent-stabilized apartments in that building were appraised by a bank at a total of $750,000, but claimed by the organization to be worth as much as $50 million. Further, Trump purportedly multiplied the value of 4–8 East 57th Street by a fixed percentage to inflate its valuation to $422 million, while neglecting to mention that his rent to the property owner was significantly increasing. The suit also asserts that, while renewing the company's coverage with Zurich Insurance Group, Weisselberg falsely claimed that the organization's assets had been reviewed by an independent appraiser.

Speaking with Fox News host Sean Hannity on the day the lawsuit was filed, Trump asserted that the disclaimers provided by Mazars on its financial statements for the organization absolve him of fraud because they admit the valuations "may be way off".
On October 13, as neither Donald nor Eric Trump had yet accepted service of the lawsuit, the OAG asked Judge Engoron for permission to electronically deliver the lawsuit to them, which he granted; the AG emailed links to relevant documents the same day. Further, the OAG revealed that on the day the lawsuit was filed, the organization registered a Delaware-based limited liability company called Trump Organization II with New York's secretary of state. The OAG accused the organization of continuing to engage in fraud after the suit was filed and possibly beginning to restructure its business, and asked Engoron to order Trump to sufficiently disclose valuation methods to an independent monitor when dealing with lenders or insurers. Additionally, the OAG requested a trial date for a year in the future. In response to the filing, Habba stated: "We have repeatedly provided assurance, in writing, that the Trump Organization has no intention of doing anything improper." On October 25, an administrative judge refused to have the case reassigned to another judge. On October 26, the organization requested a dismissal of James's request for an independent monitor, with Habba labeling it an attempt at nationalization.

On November 2, Trump filed a lawsuit (largely the work of his counsel Boris Epshteyn) in a Florida circuit court asking for an injunction against James, asserting that she (in a continuation of purported personal and political hostility) wishes to obtain records related to Trump's revocable trust (the organization's owner), which arguably fall under the protection of privacy rights granted by the Constitution of Florida. On November 3, the AG argued that Trump's lawsuit was an attempt "to shield the key documents governing the structure of his business conglomerate". Later in the month, the lawsuit was removed to federal court. James requested on December 7 that the suit be dismissed, and the following week, requested as much on the basis that she has no connection to Florida. On December 21, federal judge Donald Middlebrooks dismissed the suit, and Trump withdrew it on January 20, 2023.

On November 3, 2022, Engoron noted "persistent misrepresentations throughout every one of Mr. Trump's [financial statements] between 2011 and 2021" and said the AG's lawsuit was likely to succeed. Engoron then:
 imposed an independent monitor, calling it "the most prudent and narrowly tailored mechanism to ensure there is no further fraud or illegality";
 ruled that the organization must gain court approval before selling assets "to ensure that defendants do not dissipate their [assets] or transfer them out of this jurisdiction" and required Trump to provide 14 days notice before transferring any non-cash asset listed on his 2021 financial statement;
 dismissed Trump's argument that Mazars' disclaimers protect him.

Both the OAG and organization were asked to suggest three candidates for the monitor by November 10 and to comment on the other's choices, though the final selection would be up to Engoron. On November 7, lawyers for the organization appealed the appointment of a monitor, claiming that it would limit their business activities in "unlawful" ways. The appeal hearing was set for later in the month. The company's lawyers also asked for the order to be stayed pending the appeal, but this was denied. Both sides suggested retired judge Barbara S. Jones, who was appointed that month and began monitoring the organization by December. Early that month, Ivanka Trump was released as a defendant (including the monitoring process) on the basis that she was no longer involved with the company, despite the AG having called her "a key player" in many potentially fraudulent transactions.

On November 21, lawyers for the Trumps and the organization asked for the lawsuit to be dismissed. The next day, Engoron denied the organization's request to delay trial for at least 15 months and tentatively scheduled trial for October 2, 2023. On January 6, 2023, Engoron dismissed the request to dismiss the lawsuit, which he labelled "frivolous" due to it relying on previously rebuffed arguments, although he decided against imposing sanctions on Trump's lawyers; the judge rejected arguments that some alleged illegal conduct had occurred outside the statute of limitations and also denied a request from Ivanka Trump to dismiss the charges against her.

On January 26, 2023, Trump's lawyers disputed the lawsuit's definitions of the "Trump Organization" and "defendants", saying they were improperly associated with one another, and arguing that the corporation does not exist "for legal purposes". The suit only uses the name "Trump Organization" generally and does not specify it as a defendant, but does name 10 of its entities including the "The Trump Organization, Inc." corporation. It also names as defendants Donald Trump and his three oldest children, as well as Weisselberg and Jeffrey McConney, a senior vice president and controller who worked at the company for almost 35 years.

On January 31, the OAG requested a pre-trial conference to discuss imposing sanctions on the Trumps due to some of the defenses they provided the court with being "demonstrably false" due to their contradictory nature, reliance on dismissed arguments, or other failures to address allegations made against them or their company. A hearing about the matter was held on February 1, which Habba was absent from. Trump lawyers argued against sanctions and the suit's use of the organization's name, while the AG's senior enforcement counsel complained that in the January 26 filing, the defendants had avoided admitting that Trump remained the de facto president of the company during his tenure as U.S. president (which he stated under oath in another lawsuit); the judge affirmed that the trial would be held on October 2.

In mid-February, Trump's team subpoenaed former Deutsche Bank managing director Rosemary Vrablic, who served as his private banker for years, for documents and testimony related to the case. They had also subpoenaed Mazars accountant Donald Bender, who served the organization for a number of years. By the end of February, Trump's team also subpoenaed Michael Cohen, and the AG indicated that she may attempt to redepose Donald and Eric Trump.

Despite the judge's firm trial date, on March 3, Trump's team asked for a six-month suspension for further discovery and preparation. They cited a "staggering volume" of 275,000 documents to review (which, according to the vice president of the Republican-tied  firm which prepared the data, would take 11,000 man-hours to read) as well as subpoenas to carry out. The OAG held that most of the documents come from Trump's circles and should thus already be familiar to the defense. Ivanka Trump's counsel also requested a delay to prepare a defense (centered on her lack of involvement in preparing allegedly fraudulent statements) on the basis of her role in the case being uniquely complicated. On March 15, James asked the judge to deny Donald Trump's delay request to avoid being further delayed by his 2024 campaign. A hearing concerning the trial date is scheduled for March 21.

Reactions 

Some commenters pointed out the irony of Donald Trump being faced with pleading the Fifth Amendment, which he has expressed disdain for doing, saying it implies a party's guilt.

In December 2020, Hannity opined, "The president out the door needs to pardon his whole family and himself because they want this witch hunt to go on in perpetuity, they're so full of rage and insanity against the president."

In mid-2021, the Republican National Committee (RNC) agreed to financially support Trump's legal defense in both inquiries. In October, it paid $121,670 to a law firm employed by Trump. The next month, a Republican (GOP) spokesperson called Trump "a leader of our party [whose] record of achievement is critical to the GOP" and referred to the investigations as a "never ending witch hunt" by Democrats. In December, it was reported that the RNC had agreed to pay up to $1.6 million of Trump's legal expenses for both cases. Some sources have pointed out that the matters being investigated took place prior to Trump becoming president. Speaking to Hannity on Fox News in February 2022, Eric Trump argued that the investigations were only being conducted because his father was "clearly the frontrunner for 2024". In early July 2022, the Washington Examiner reported that Trump was considering announcing his presidential run soon, apparently in order to increase his sway against the "scathing hearings" in the House Select Committee on the January 6 Attack. The RNC indicated that it would cut off legal funding for Trump as required if he officially announced his candidacy.

On January 20, 2022, Axios reported that some of Trump's associates have expressed concern with his choice of lawyer in his dispute with the New York AG. Alina Habba of New Jersey has represented Trump in his lawsuit against his niece and in alleged sexual misconduct cases involving E. Jean Carroll and Summer Zervos. According to some of his associates, Trump has a pattern of hiring lawyers to take on cases that are not designed to be won so much as draw publicity. One source close to Trump stated that he had "fallen prey to inexperienced lawyers who are just telling him what he wants to hear", while Eric Trump defended Habba as "incredibly competent". A top D.C. lawyer called Habba's legal motions against James "a huge stretch", but acknowledged: "Prosecutors are supposed to be above politics and just about the facts. When they sound more like politicians, they can get in real trouble with judges." In March, The Daily Beast reported that most of the Trump family's legal team detested Habba's work, causing the organization (via Eric Trump) to again call her "incredibly competent".

On February 22, Newsweek published an article about what it expected the depositions of Trump and his two oldest children to accomplish; it cites legal expert Barbara McQuade, who stated that the depositions would provide an opportunity to explain "the wild [valuation] discrepancies", saying, "that could end the investigation [but if Trump] lacks innocent explanations ... that will also be informative." McQuade also said discrepancies between the three Trumps' testimonies could suggest whether lies are being told and reiterated that a jury in a civil trial could "draw an adverse inference" from invocations of the Fifth Amendment right against self-incrimination.

On May 7, former U.S. attorney for the Southern District of New York Preet Bharara tweeted, "Let he who has never lost four cellphones cast the first stone." On June 14, Business Insider reported that the New York AG would investigate $250 million donated to Trump's campaign after he began claiming the election had been stolen; the next day, The Daily Beast stated that this would branch off from her civil investigation of the Trump Organization. Insider subsequently reported that seven sets of legal proceedings involving Trump were expected to unfold before early August, forcing his lawyers to request the rescheduling of Galicia v. Trump, a civil trial involving protestors who were allegedly attacked by Trump Tower security guards. Soon after, Insider cited a Manhattan fraud expert who stated, "There's no New York law that says you have to keep your documents in general," but that the lack of Trump's handwritten notes paints a "fraud mosaic". After Trump's deposition, a former lawyer for the OAG called his refusal to answer questions "one of the best outcomes [the AG] could have hoped for". In late August, the former New York AG prosecutor who outlined a $25 million settlement from Trump University said of the civil case, "Deposing Trump is looking for the icing on the cake."

On August 31, Politico pointed out that in early May, Habba searched some of the areas of Mar-a-Lago where documents were stored that the Justice Department subpoenaed a few days later (leading to the Federal Bureau of Investigation's search of the estate in early August). Politico questioned whether Habba handled any of these documents and whether she had the security clearance to do so. Writing for Business Insider, Laura Italiano speculated about actions the AG's then-impending lawsuit might call for, such as a preliminary injunction, a temporary restraining order, or revoking Trump's corporate charter. On September 22, The Wall Street Journal editorial board—having written earlier in the year that the investigation "looks like more evidence of the decline of America's rule of law"—stated that "Trump has made a business and political career of getting away with whatever he can, and it's easy to imagine he crossed a line." Later in the month, a former assistant DA and asset forfeiture chief in the Manhattan DA's office argued that the civil case would be "very difficult ... for the defendants to win. One of the best defenses to this matter is to delay." New York Times columnist Gail Collins opined that Trump supporters would not be alienated by the former president's apparent fraud due to his already being well-known for distorting the truth.

In early October, a former Manhattan prosecutor called the financial statement disclaimers provided by Mazars "a hurdle" in the civil case, while a former AG lawyer argued that they protect Trump. Reuters pointed out that some commentators have viewed James's lawsuit as a significant threat to Trump, but it may take years for the proceedings to unfold and it may be difficult to prove fraud; institutions such as Deutsche Bank could have suspected that Trump's statements were exaggerated and accepted the risk, calculating that it would benefit from this. A Curbed article about the state of Trump's real-estate empire in New York City concludes that "In effect, his footprint in New York has already been shrinking for years, and James's lawsuit, while it may never come to fruition, has already laid that bare." Michael Cohen predicted that the lawsuit would "financially destroy" Trump and lead to his being perp walked. Satirical media outlet The Onion joked that Trump had changed his name to Donald Trump 2 to evade the lawsuit.

In early November, The New York Times reported that some of Trump's own lawyers opposed the lawsuit filed on his behalf in Florida, believing it unlikely to succeed; the organization's general counsel reportedly warned that it may constitute malpractice. A Florida law firm partner was quoted as saying, "This, certainly on its face, appears to be objectively frivolous. I'm aware of no authority that allows a state court in Florida to enjoin or otherwise interfere with a law enforcement investigation being conducted by New York state authorities."

Ahead of the 2022 midterm elections, Fox News published an Associated Press article about James's  campaign, describing her in the headline as "Donald Trump's chief legal nemeses ".

On November 16, a New York appeals court ruled that Cohen could sue the organization to reimburse legal fees (in the range of millions of dollars) for Trump-related litigation including the investigations by the DA and AG.

After the organization was convicted in the criminal case in mid-December 2022, former Manhattan district attorney Cyrus Vance Jr., who began that investigation, argued that the verdict would influence whether the imposition of an independent monitor was appropriate.

On January 1, 2023, an MSNBC opinion columnist cited the investigations amongst several others in arguing that Trump was likely to be charged that year. Writing for New York Daily News, investigative journalist David Cay Johnston stated that Trump's publicly released tax returns were "rich with what the IRS calls 'badges of fraud,'" such as "hundreds of thousands of dollars in unexplained expenses" on numerous Schedule C forms showing zero income and "revenues and expenses that [suspiciously match] to the dollar". Johnston pointed out that the former method was used by Trump in 1984 and (according to Johnston) found by New York judges to constitute civil tax fraud, which he argued that Trump undoubtedly knew before repeating 26 times, thus providing evidence of mens rea (knowledge of one's criminal intent).

In late January 2023, Business Insider opined that Trump's effort to void the $110,000 contempt fine was "an odd side-show" to the $250 million lawsuit.

On February 1, Cohen speculated that the civil case would ultimately result in $700 million in fines for Trump.

On February 22, Forbes reported that "new revelations about Trump Tower suggest that the building is—and always was—something of a fraud." The article cites:
 "Property records [showing] that [Trump] has been lying about the financial performance of the building since it first opened in 1983";
 financial documents indicating that "Trump lied about the square footage of the office and retail space at the base of the property" (separate from the inflation of his penthouse);
 "Portions of a [newly released] 2015 audio recording [which] prove that Trump was personally involved in the efforts to lie about the value of Trump Tower's commercial space".
After Ivanka Trump requested a delay to prepare her defense, some media outlets speculated that she had decided to stop protecting family members allegedly involved in fraudulent activity.

See also
 List of lawsuits involving Donald Trump

Notes

References

Donald Trump controversies
Donald Trump litigation
The Trump Organization